Thelymitra yorkensis, commonly called the York sun orchid or bronze sun orchid, is a species of orchid in the family Orchidaceae and is endemic to a small area in the south-west of Western Australia. It has a single erect, flat, leathery leaf and up to twelve crowded, cinnamon scented, orange-coloured flowers with reddish brown edges. The column has broad, deeply fringed, orange wings.

Description
The labellum (the lowest petal) is narrower than the other petals and sepals. The lobe on the top of the anther has a dense mas of short hairs on its back and a club-like appendage on its top. The flowers are insect pollinated and open on sunny days. Flowering occurs in November and December.

Taxonomy and naming
Thelymitra yorkensis was first formally described in 2006 by Jeff Jeanes from a specimen collected near York and the description was published in Muelleria. The specific epithet (yorkensis) refers to the town near where all known populations occur.

Distribution and habitat
The York sun orchid grows with Eucalyptus wandoo and Eucalyptus accedens trees near York in the Jarrah Forest biogeographic region.

Conservation
Thelymitra yorkensis is classified as "Priority Three" by the Government of Western Australia Department of Parks and Wildlife meaning that it is poorly known and known from only a few locations but is not under imminent threat.

References

External links
 

yorkensis
Endemic orchids of Australia
Orchids of Western Australia
Plants described in 2006